Saartha (meaning caravan) is an Indian novel written in Kannada language by S.L. Bhyrappa. Through a caravan, the book explores the whole of 8th century India, covering the political, economical, artistic and spiritual life of the country. It uses some historical personalities like Adi Shankaracharya, Maṇḍana Miśra, Ubhaya Bharati and Kumārila Bhaṭṭa and institutions like Nalanda. Its Sanskrit translation was received by Sanskrit scholars like a work originally written in the language. It has also been translated into Hindi and English, published by Oxford University Press, Chennai.

References

20th-century Indian novels
1998 novels
Kannada novels
Novels by S. L. Bhyrappa
Novels set in the 8th century